Lalit Prabhakar is an Indian film, television and theatre actor predominantly working in the Marathi film industry. He is best known for his role as Aditya Desai on the popular daily soap Julun Yeti Reshimgathi and his debut film as main actor in the film Chi Va Chi Sau Ka.

Career 
Lalit is a theatre artist. Before moving to television, he was part of Avinash Narkar’s play Takshakyag. He has also directed and acted in a play which is Marathi translation of Italo Calvino's Invisible Cities with same name. In 2016, he directed experimental play ""

His debut TV show was Jeevalga on Star Pravah. He also played role of Mohit in Kunku. He played role of antagonist, Lakhnya, in Gandh Phulancha Gela Sangun which gave him some recognition but he got fame and became household name after playing Aditya Desai of Julun Yeti Reshimgathi. His chemistry with lead actress Prajakta Mali struck the chord and Prabhakar won Best actor award at Zee Marathi Awards in 2014. He had received Young Artists Scholarship by Ministry of Culture, Central Govt. of India for 2010–2012 which is given to only 30 artists all over India. He played a role of director-cum-Minal's love interest in Dil Dosti Duniyadari as Kabir. He has hosted Talkies Light House along with Neha Mahajan on Zee Talkies.

Personal life 
Lalit was born on 12 September 1987 in Kalyan and his hometown is Samode, Dhule. His full name is Lalit Prabhakar Bhadane. He studied in Jawahar Navodaya Vidyalaya, Palghar and holds a BSc in Computer Science. He joined theatre group "Mitee-Chaar Kalyan" in his teenage and did many experimental plays with this group. He is an atheist.

Media image 
He was ranked sixth in The Times of India's Top 20 Most Desirable Men of Maharashtra in 2017. He was ranked seventh in 2018 and twelfth in 2020.

Filmography

Films

Television

Plays

Web series

References

External links 

 
 

Marathi actors
Indian male soap opera actors
Indian male television actors
Living people
1987 births
Male actors from Maharashtra
Male actors in Marathi cinema
Male actors in Marathi television
Male actors in Marathi theatre